Sardar Bahadur Khan Maikan is a Pakistani politician who was a Member of the Provincial Assembly of the Punjab, from May 2013 to May 2018.

Early life and education
He was born on 5 February 1956.

He has a degree of Bachelor of Arts which he obtained in 2005 from Allama Iqbal Open University.

Political career

He was elected to the Provincial Assembly of the Punjab as an independent candidate from Constituency PP-38 (Sarghoda-XI) in 2013 Pakistani general election. He joined Pakistan Muslim League (N) in May 2013.

References

Living people
Punjab MPAs 2013–2018
1956 births
Pakistan Muslim League (N) politicians
Allama Iqbal Open University alumni